Fazrul Nawaz bin Shahul Hameed (born 17 October 1985) is a Singapore international footballer who play as a striker for Singapore Premier League club Tampines Rovers .

Club career

Geylang United
Fazrul went to a trial by Geylang United for Prime League players and was signed by the club in 2004. He left the club in 2006.

Young Lions
In 2006 to 2007, Fazrul signed for Young Lions.

Geylang United
He returned to Geylang in 2008. However, he was released by the club after a contractual dispute and it was reported in Malay newspapers that he had finally signed for Gombak United after strong rumours that he would join Sengkang Punggol  with his former team-mates Aide Iskandar, Noh Rahman and Amos Boon. However these rumours have since been proven to be false and Fazrul has been clubless for half a year.

Gombak United
In May 2009, Gombak United coach Darren Stewart had announced that Fazrul will be joining his team. He made an immediate impact on his new team, scored 7 goals in 15 appearances for his new club. The following season, he scored 18 goals in 31 games for Gombak United, becoming the highest born local top scorer in the league.

SAFFC
In 2011 he joined SAFFC. And decided to join Lionsxii in 2013. Over the two seasons spent at SAFFC, he scored 20 goals in 58 appearances for the club.

LionsXII
Fazrul left the Warriors for LionsXII in January 2013 to play in the Malaysia super league. However, he was released in December 2013 after scoring just 4 goals in an injury-stricken season.

Home United
He then signed for Home United in 2014 and went on to score 14 goals in 34 games for the team, again becoming the highest local top scorer in that season.

Sabah FA
In December 2014, he signed a 12 months contract with the Malaysia Premier League side, Sabah FA , however he was released 4 months later after suffering from an injury on his left knee. During his 4 months stay with the Malaysian club, he managed to score twice in 5 league appearances for the team.

Return to the Warriors
Following the end of his short stint with Sabah, Fazrul rejoined old club Warriors FC on the 2015 S.League June mid-window transfer deadline after recovering from an injury sustain in Malaysia. He scored two goals in first match after rejoining his old club, leading the Warriors to a 4-1 win over their uniformed rivals Home United. In his second match of the season, he scored the only goal in a 1-0 win over Hougang United, sending the defending champions to second place in the table. Fazrul ended the season as the highest local-born scorer in the 2015 S.League season with 18 goals from 24 matches.

Tampines Rovers 
In December 2015, Fazrul joined Tampines Rovers FC after turning down a new contract at his former club. He scored his first goal for Tampines in the second game of the season against Hougang United. Fazrul ended the season as the second highest local-born scorer with 7 goals.

Hougang United 
In July 2018, Fazrul joined Hougang United on a record transfer fee of $50,000. In 2019, Fazrul became the captain of the team.

Personal life 
Fazrul is married and has two sons and a daughter.

Career statistics

Club

Notes

International career
Fazrul made his international debut for Singapore on 4 June 2005, against Malaysia, coming on as a substitute for Masrezwan Masturi, who had broken his nose.

In the second leg of the 2007 AFF Championship semi-final, Fazrul scored the fourth out of five successfully converted penalties for Singapore in a penalty shootout win over Malaysia.

In the 2007 South East Asian Games, Fazrul's performance in the group stages was largely criticised by the fans and the media. More criticism arose when he failed to score a penalty against Malaysia. If he had scored, Singapore would have avoided favourites Thailand in the semi-final match, which Singapore eventually lost 3–0, ending the nation's hopes for a gold or silver medal. In the Bronze Medal placing match, Fazrul made amends for his poor performance by scoring a hat-trick in a 5–0 victory against Vietnam, winning the bronze medal for Singapore.

Due to an injury to his anterior cruciate ligament, sustained in a league match against Tampines Rovers, Fazrul was forced to miss the 2008 AFF Championship, in which Singapore were knocked out in the semi-finals by Vietnam.

Prior to winning his 78th cap against Japan in a 0-3 defeat, Fazrul has amassed 9 goals in 77 appearances. He scored his 10th international goal in his 80th Singapore cap in a friendly against Myanmar on 24 March 2016. He notched his 11th goal for Singapore and the last of Head Coach Bernd Stange's reign in charge of Singapore.

International goals 
Scores and results list Singapore's goal tally first.

Personal life
His father was a national boxer who also won a Bronze Medal in a SEA Games competition in the 1970s.

Honours

Club
LionsXII
Malaysia Super League: 2013

International
Singapore
AFF Championship: 2007, 2012
Southeast Asian Games Bronze Medalist: 2007

References

External links

 http://www.sleague.com/Web/Main.aspx?ID=,887925d1-1861-49fe-945d-b5b80365ea9e&NLT=300&AID=5eae973d-5d5f-4153-aced-38e93e03e7bd
 https://web.archive.org/web/20130318012931/http://kallangroar.com/news/exclusive-interviews/exclusive-inside-fazrul-nawaz/
 https://web.archive.org/web/20130921055140/http://voxsports.co/football/fazrul-winner-reignites-lionsxii-cup-dream-sundram-warns-against-complacency
 https://web.archive.org/web/20130921142000/http://www.goal.com/en-sg/match/120570/lionsxii-vs-sarawak-fa/report?ICID=CP_3205
 https://web.archive.org/web/20141006074806/http://www.affsuzukicup.com/news/singapore-4-laos-3

1985 births
Living people
Singaporean Muslims
Singaporean people of Indian descent
Singaporean footballers
Singapore international footballers
Singaporean expatriate footballers
Association football forwards
Geylang International FC players
Gombak United FC players
Warriors FC players
Home United FC players
LionsXII players
Singapore Premier League players
Malaysia Super League players
Young Lions FC players
Footballers at the 2006 Asian Games
Southeast Asian Games bronze medalists for Singapore
Southeast Asian Games medalists in football
Competitors at the 2007 Southeast Asian Games
Asian Games competitors for Singapore